The Lamprocerini are a tribe of fireflies in the large subfamily Lampyrinae, though at least some Lamprocerini species are not bioluminescent in the adult stage. They are generally neotropical, found in North America only as vagrants.

Systematics
The group has recently been examined using molecular phylogenetics, using fairly comprehensive sampling.

Genera
 Alecton Laporte, 1833
 Lamprocera Laporte, 1833
 Lucernuta Laporte, 1833
 Lucio Laporte, 1833
 Lychnacris Motschulsky, 1853
 Tenaspis LeConte, 1881

Footnotes

References

  (2007): Phylogeny of North American fireflies (Coleoptera: Lampyridae): Implications for the evolution of light signals. Mol. Phylogenet. Evol. 45(1): 33–49.   PDF fulltext

Lampyridae
Beetle tribes